This is a list of girls' schools in Australia.

Australian Capital Territory
 Canberra Girls Grammar School
 Merici College
 St Clare's College

New South Wales
 Abbotsleigh
 Ascham School
 Asquith Girls High School
 Bethlehem College, Ashfield
 Blacktown Girls High School
 Brigidine College, St Ives
 Burwood Girls High School
 Caroline Chisholm College
 Catherine McAuley Westmead
 Cheltenham Girls High School
 Danebank 
 Domremy College
 Frensham School
 Georges River College (Penshurst Girls Campus)
 Hornsby Girls' High School
 Kambala School
 Kincoppal School
 Loreto Kirribilli
 Loreto Normanhurst
 MacKillop College, Bathurst
 Marist Sisters' College, Woolwich
 Meriden School
 MLC School
 Monte Sant'Angelo Mercy College
 Mount St Benedict College
 Nagle College, Blacktown
 New England Girls' School
 North Sydney Girls High School
 Our Lady of Mercy College
 Our Lady of the Sacred Heart College
 Presbyterian Ladies' College, Armidale
 Presbyterian Ladies' College, Sydney
 Pymble Ladies' College
 Queenwood School for Girls
 Randwick Girls' High School
 Ravenswood School for Girls
 Roseville College
 SCEGGS Darlinghurst
 St Catherine's School, Waverley
 St Clare's College, Waverley
 St George Girls High School
 St Mary Star of the Sea College, Wollongong
 St Patrick's College, Campbelltown
 St Scholastica's College
 St Ursula's College, Kingsgrove
 St Vincent's College, Potts Point
 Santa Sabina College
 Stella Marris College
 Strathfield Girls High School
 Sydney Girls High School
 Tangara School for Girls
 Tara Anglican School for Girls
 Wenona School
 Wiley Park Girls High School

Queensland
 All Hallows' School
 Brigidine College, Indooroopilly
 Brisbane Girls Grammar School
 Clayfield College
 Fairholme College
 The Glennie School
 Ipswich Girls' Grammar School
 Loreto College Coorparoo
 Lourdes Hill College
 Mary MacKillop College, Brisbane
 Moreton Bay College
 Mount Alvernia College
 Mount St Michael's College, Ashgrove
 Rockhampton Girls Grammar School
 St Aidan's Anglican Girls' School
 St Hilda's School
 St John Fisher College, Bracken Ridge
 St Margaret Mary's College
 St Margaret's Anglican Girls' School
 St Mary's College, Ipswich
 St Monica's College
 St Patrick's College, Townsville
 St Rita's College
 St Ursula's College, Toowoomba
 St Ursula's College, Yeppoon
 Somerville House (formerly Brisbane High School for Girls)
 Stuartholme School
 The Glennie School

South Australia
 Kildare College
 Loreto College, Marryatville
 Mary MacKillop College, Kensington
 Mitcham Girls High School
 Our Lady of the Sacred Heart College
 Roma Mitchell Secondary College 
 St Aloysius College, Adelaide
 St Dominic's Priory College, Adelaide
 St Mary's College
 St Peter's Girls' School
 Seymour College
 Walford Anglican School for Girls
 Wilderness School

Tasmania
 Fahan School
 Mount Carmel College
 Ogilvie High School,(to become coeducational)
 St Mary's College
 St Michael's Collegiate School

Victoria
 Ave Maria College
 Avila College
 Beth Rivkah Ladies College
 Camberwell Girls Grammar School
 Canterbury Girls' Secondary College
 Catholic Ladies College
 Clonard College
 Fintona Girls' School
 Firbank Girls' Grammar School
 Matthew Flinders Girls Secondary College
 Genazzano FCJ College
 Ivanhoe Girls' Grammar School
 Kilbreda College
 Korowa Anglican Girls' School
 Lauriston Girls' School
 Loreto College Ballarat
 Loreto Mandeville Hall
 Lowther Hall Anglican Grammar School
 Mac.Robertson Girls' High School
 Mater Christi College
 Melbourne Girls' College
 Melbourne Girls Grammar
 Mentone Girls' Grammar School
 Mentone Girls' Secondary College
 Mercy College, Coburg
 Methodist Ladies' College
 Mount St Joseph Girls' College
 Our Lady of Mercy College
 Our Lady of Sion College
 Our Lady of the Sacred Heart College, Bentleigh
 Pascoe Vale Girls College
 Presbyterian Ladies' College
 Presentation College, Windsor
 Ruyton Girls' School
 Sacré Cœur School
 Sacred Heart College, Geelong
 Sacred Heart Girls' College
 St Aloysius' College
 St Catherine's School, Toorak
 St Columba's College
 St Margaret's School
 Santa Maria College
 Shelford Girls' Grammar
 Siena College
 Star of the Sea College
 Strathcona Baptist Girls Grammar School
 Toorak College, Mount Eliza
 Worawa Aboriginal College

Western Australia
 Iona Presentation College
 Mercedes College
 Methodist Ladies' College
 Penrhos College
 Perth College
 Presbyterian Ladies' College
 St Brigid's College
 St Hilda's Anglican School for Girls
 St Mary's Anglican Girls' School
 Santa Maria College, Perth

Former girls' schools
 Brisbane South Girls and Infants School
 Marymount College, merged into Sacred Heart College Middle School
 Maryborough Girls' High School, merged into Maryborough State High School
 Newcastle Girls' High School, became Newcastle High School
 Osborne Ladies' College
 Penleigh Presbyterian Ladies' College, now Penleigh and Essendon Grammar School
 Saint Mary's Girls' High School, merged into St Mary's College, Maryborough

See also
 Association of Heads of Independent Girls' Schools
 Queensland Girls' Secondary Schools Sports Association
 List of boys' schools in Australia

References

Girls
Australia